Henry Knight may refer to:

Politicians
Henry Knight (Great Grimsby MP) (1728–1762), British Member of Parliament for Great Grimsby
Henry Gally Knight (1786–1846), British politician
Henry Foley Knight (1886–1960), British administrator and civil servant

Others
Henry Knight (bishop) (1859–1920), Bishop of Gibraltar in the Church of England
Henry Knight (cricketer) (1796–1843), English cricketer
Henry James Knight (1878–1955), English recipient of the Victoria Cross
Henry Granger Knight (1878–1942), American chemist 
Henry Knight (rugby league), New Zealand international

See also
Harry Knight (disambiguation)